Voice Coaches is a voice-over production and training company headquartered in Albany, New York. Company services include voice-over and communication training as well as voice-over recording and production. Voice Coaches is owned and operated by composer, producer, sound designer, and voice over director David Bourgeois and his wife Anna.

Company History

Voice Coaches has been operational since the year 2000.

Training

Voice Coaches provides services across the US and Canada, offering voice over production and communication training.

Production

In addition to voice over training, Bourgeois and Voice Coaches have also produced voice over content for a variety of projects in commercial and narrative media as well as film and television, including the TLC series While You Were Out and HGTV's FreeStyle. Other production clients include Discovery Channel, WE tv, and Universal Music Group. 

The company is currently working with actress Gabriella Pizzolo to produce voice over for a Nickelodeon series.

References 

Companies based in Albany, New York
Voice acting